George Roman Melnyk (born 1946) is a Canadian cultural historian.  Melnyk is Professor Emeritus of Communication, Media and Film at the University of Calgary. He holds a Bachelor of Arts degree in history from the University of Manitoba, a Master of Arts degree in history from the University of Chicago, and a Master of Arts degree in philosophy from the University of Toronto.
He is the author or editor of 30 books on Canadian Studies topics, including ONE HUNDRED YEARS OF CANADIAN CINEMA (2004) and FILM AND THE CITY (2014). His most recent books are WE ARE ONE: Poems from the Pandemic (Bayeux Arts 2020), FINDING REFUGE IN CANADA: NARRATIVES OF DISLOCATION (2021 Athabasca U Press) and his literary memoir BREAKING WORDS: A LITERARY CONFESSION (2021 Bayeux Arts).

References

External links 
 

1946 births
20th-century Canadian historians
Living people
Mass media scholars
Academic staff of the University of Calgary
University of Chicago alumni
University of Manitoba alumni
University of Toronto alumni
21st-century Canadian historians